The Mad Gear and Missile Kid is an EP by American rock band My Chemical Romance. It is the first and only release by the band featuring Michael Pedicone.

Background
Guitarist Frank Iero told MTV "It's basically what the Killjoys are listening to in the car as they're having those gun battles". In an interview with Alternative Press, Gerard Way stated a desire to create a Mad Gear and Missile Kid full-length album, but did not do so before the band's break-up in 2013. This EP was released to streaming services on August 26th, 2022.

Cover art
The EP's cover artwork showcases the Dead Pegasus logo featured in the Danger Days music videos, specifically featured on Gerard Way's jacket.

Track listing
All songs written by My Chemical Romance.

Critical reception

The Mad Gear and Missile Kid has received positive reviews from music critics, with particular praise for both its fun nature and sound. Ian Walker of AbsolutePunk gave the EP a positive review, stating it "clocks in at just under six minutes, but provides a quick injection of musical speed that gets the blood pumping and the body moving." Walker further went on to say, "My Chemical Romance reminds us that music should, first and foremost, be fun. And I can't see them not having a good time as they put this tiny project together. It radiates through every second."

Personnel
 Gerard Way – lead vocals, production
 Mikey Way – bass guitar, production
 Frank Iero – rhythm guitar, backing vocals, production
 Ray Toro – lead guitar, backing vocals, production
 Michael Pedicone – drums, percussion
 Dan Chase – recording
 Doug McKean – mixing

References

2010 EPs
My Chemical Romance EPs
Reprise Records EPs